ZZ Top's First Album is the debut studio album by American rock band ZZ Top. It was produced by Bill Ham, and released on January 16, 1971, on London Records. Establishing ZZ Top's attitude and humor, the album incorporates styles such as blues, boogie, hard rock, and Southern rock influences. Thematically, the album is about personal experiences and sexual innuendos. "(Somebody Else Been) Shakin' Your Tree" was the only single released from the album.

Background, recording and release
The album was recorded at Robin Hood Studios in Tyler, Texas. ZZ Top frontman Billy Gibbons said: 

We called the record ZZ Top's First Album because we wanted everyone to know that there would be more. We weren't certain if we'd get another chance in the studio, but we had high hopes.

The only single released from the album was "(Somebody Else Been) Shakin' Your Tree" (backed with "Neighbor, Neighbor") on London Records (release number 45-138). It failed to appear on the Billboard charts.

In 1987, the album was remixed for CD release. In 2013, the original vinyl mix was released on HD Tracks in high-resolution digital download formats. The original mix of the album was released on CD in June 2013 as part of the box set The Complete Studio Albums (1970–1990).  In October 2017  a 180 gram vinyl edition of the album was released, using the original mix.

Reception

AllMusic retrospectively gave it 3 stars, stating: "ZZ Top's First Album may not be perfectly polished, but it does establish their sound, attitude, and quirks."

Track listing

Personnel
ZZ Top
Billy Gibbons – guitar, vocals
Dusty Hill – bass, backing vocals, lead vocal on "Goin' Down to Mexico", co-lead vocal on "Squank"
Frank Beard – drums, percussion (credited as "Rube Beard")

Production
Producer – Bill Ham

References

London Records albums
ZZ Top albums
1971 debut albums
Albums produced by Bill Ham